"Thinking It Over" is the debut single of English-Irish pop group Liberty, before they became Liberty X. The garage song was produced by Pete Devereux (of Artful Dodger) and the Wideboys. It was co-written by band members Kelli Young and Tony Lundon. In the United Kingdom, the single was a hit, reaching number five, but was not as successful internationally, peaking at number 29 in Ireland and number 81 in Australia.

Background
While the five winning contestants of Popstars formed Hear'Say, the five runner-up contestants formed the group Liberty. The name Liberty was chosen to reflect the freedom the members experienced following their participation in Popstars. Amidst pejorative media commentary, including the term "Flopstars", the band proceeded to sign a multimillion-pound record contract with Richard Branson's independent record label, V2 Records.

In response to the media backlash and push-back from the record label, the band initially released the song as a white label promo. In an interview with The Vault in 2013, Kelli said "We knew that we wanted to do an R&B/pop sound and everyone was telling us that was not an achievable thing [..] and no one was going to play it. So, we had to trick people.  We released Thinking It Over on white label and we didn't put our name on it [...] We got lots of spot plays on the radio and all the clubs started playing it."

Thus, their debut single, "Thinking It Over", was released on 24 September 2001. It came backed with three B-sides: "No Clouds", "Greed" and "Let's Get Working", the latter of which has never been released on CD in the United Kingdom.

Music video
The video for the track was filmed in a studio using green screen. It is set inside a skyline apartment in Manhattan, with the band performing in and around the lounge area. Despite the fact the video was filmed on a very low budget, it uses special effects to show and remove holographic images of the band from the apartment, to allow for different vocal sections of the song. It was the band's only video to be included on the physical single from the "Thinking It Over" era.

Track listings

UK CD1
 "Thinking It Over" (full length version) – 4:05
 "No Clouds" (first version) – 4:14
 "Greed" – 3:42
 "Thinking It Over" (video)

UK CD2
 "Thinking It Over" (Pete Devereux & The Wideboys club vocal remix) – 5:14
 "Thinking It Over" (The Wideboys remix) – 5:31
 "Thinking It Over" (Almighty 7-inch mix) – 3:43
 "Thinking It Over" (Kinky Boy remix edit) – 5:14

UK cassette single
 "Thinking It Over" (full length version) – 4:05
 "Thinking It Over" (Kinky Boy remix) – 6:42
 "Let's Get Working" – 4:15

Australian and New Zealand CD single
 "Thinking It Over" – 4:05
 "No Clouds" (first version) – 4:14
 "Greed" – 3:42
 "Thinking It Over" (Pete Devereux & The Wideboys club vocal remix) – 5:14
 "Thinking It Over" (Kinky Boy remix edit) – 5:14
 "Thinking It Over" (video)

Charts

Weekly charts

Year-end charts

Release history

References

2001 songs
2001 debut singles
Liberty X songs
UK garage songs
V2 Records singles
Songs with lyrics by Mary Susan Applegate